Josh Groban on Stage is a concert tour by American singer Josh Groban. Launched in support of his 2015 show tunes album Stages, the tour featured a night of Broadway songs and originals later on.  The tour was announced on April 16, 2015, with dates running September 12-November 3, 2015 and tickets going on sale April 24. However, Groban was sick for part of the tour so the first leg ended on December 21, 2015.

Opening acts and guests
Lena Hall (Performed duets and solo during the first leg) 
Foy Vance (Summer 2016 July 25-August 27)
Sarah McLachlan (Summer 2016 July 15-August 27)

Set list

Tour dates

Box office data

References

2015 concert tours
2016 concert tours
Josh Groban concert tours